Electronic Reference Library (ERL) is a client to server approach to networking CD-ROM and magnetic databases by SilverPlatter. It enables access from Mac and UNIX machines. At present, there are only UNIX clients for workstations running Solaris 2.3 or greater, AIX and OpenServer, but it will be ported to other Unixes eventually. In the meantime, it is possible for Unix and other users for whom there is no client software to access ERL by telnet or the World Wide Web.

Computer networking